Open Graves is a 2009 horror film directed by Álvaro de Armiñán and written by Bruce A. Taylor and Roderick Taylor. The film stars Eliza Dushku, Mike Vogel, Naike Rivelli and Lindsay Robba.

Plot
In the medieval era, a witch named Mamba is tortured and skinned alive in punishment for her crimes. Her skin and organs are then used to make a cursed game. A player who wins the game is granted a wish; however, a player losing the game is killed in a fashion predicted by the game.

In the present day, Jason (Mike Vogel), while shopping with his friend Tomas (Iman Nazemzadeh) and Tomas' girlfriend Lisa (Lindsay Caroline Robba), acquires the board game from a disabled shop owner called Malek (Alex O'Dogherty). The three friends travel back to Tomas' beachfront house, and at night a party occurs on the beach. Jason meets Erica (Eliza Dushku) before it begins to rain, causing most of the partygoers to leave. Erica suggests that the remaining friends—Jason, Tomas, Lisa, Elena (Naike Rivelli), Miguel (Ander Pardo), Pablo (Boris Martinez), and herself—play the game, to which they all agree.

However, Pablo is soon eliminated and takes Tomas' car to go get beer. On his travels, Pablo stops to urinate, but falls over the edge of a cliff. He survives the fall, but a group of crabs then attacks him, gouging out his eyes and killing him. Meanwhile, Miguel, Lisa, Elena, and Tomas also lose the game, before Detective Izar (Gary Piquer) arrives and informs the group of Pablo's death, cutting the game short.

The group attends Pablo's funeral, where Erica realizes that his death mirrors the game's prediction. Soon after, Tomas, Lisa, and Miguel travel to an empty wood-cutting factory belonging to Miguel’s family to have a photo shoot. While Lisa is modeling, she begins to feel unwell; she stops the photo shoot and leaves with Tomas. After their departure, Miguel is left alone and becomes vulnerable to the danger of snakes. He attempts to climb a stack of logs, but a snake bites him, and he falls into a large group of snakes that kill him.

Meanwhile, Jason and Erica start a romance. While they are in Jason's car, they witness ghostly versions of Pablo and Miguel, before receiving a call from Tomas telling them of Miguel's death. Jason and Erica meet Tomas, Lisa, and Elena at Tomas' apartment, where they tell the others that they suspect that the group members are dying because of the game. Tomas, Lisa, and Elena remain skeptical, however. After Jason, Erica, and Elena have left, Lisa becomes more ill. Tomas tends to her, before the pair go to bed. The following morning, Lisa has aged into an old woman and is rushed to the hospital.

Jason, Erica, and Elena arrive at the hospital and tell Detective Izar their theory about the game. They then go in to see Lisa. Elena becomes distraught at her appearance and about her friends' deaths, and leaves despite Tomas' attempts to get her to stay. Lisa soon dies, prompting Jason, Erica, and Tomas to seek answers from Malek.

They find Malek at his home, but he is no longer disabled. He explains to them that he won the game and wishes to no longer be disabled. Meanwhile, Elena is traveling home to Milan in her car when she is involved in a car accident. Her car leaks gas, and a broken electrical wire ignites it, burning her to death. Jason, Erica, and Tomas go to Jason's house, where they find Detective Izar looking for the game. Jason and Erica escape with it, but Tomas is caught by the detective, who puts him in the trunk of his car. Later, Jason receives a call from the detective demanding the game in return for Tomas, but Tomas attempts to escape, and the detective shoots him dead.

At Tomas' beachfront house, Jason and Erica decide to play the game in the hope that they can win and wish for it to be a week in the past, so that their friends will be alive. Erica is eliminated, and realizes that her death will involve the sea. Jason wins the game, and will get his wish as long as he passes the game onto another person. Jason and Erica go to bed, but Erica discovers she must die for Jason to get his wish, so she enters the sea. Jason wakes up and rushes out to save her, but Detective Izar shows up, takes away the game and leaves with it. Erica then emerges from the sea and reveals herself to be Mamba, granting Jason his wish that they have never played the game. However, Jason and his friends now become trapped, forced to relive the week again and again.

Cast

Production
The film was shot in Spain from October to November 2006 under the working title Mamba in Getxo, Sopelana, Mundaka, Vizcaya, País Vasco and Madrid. The movie has been picked up for distribution by Voltage Pictures and was released in 2009. The official trailer and poster were released on February 26, 2008.

Soundtrack
The rock band Showpay recorded seven songs for the soundtrack, and shot a music video in which their members played "Mamba" and died. The soundtrack has been composed by Fernando Orti Salvador and recorded in Bratislava with the Bratislava Symphony Orchestra, conducted by David Hernando.

Release
The film premiered on Syfy on 19 September 2009. Lionsgate released the DVD on 23 February 2010. The UK DVD was released on 15 February 2010 over Icon Home Entertainment.

Mamba board game

In the movie's universe, the fictional game's board and pieces were made from the skin and body of a witch named Mamba Mosamba who was executed after having been tried and convicted of witchcraft during the Spanish Inquisition under Torquemada. The game consists of a wooden case with a dragonfly motif, a board with sequential spaces laid out in a spiral, an instruction sheet, small wooden playing pieces, two dice, a set of cards, and a central tower with two snakes and a dial.

The object of the game is for a player to get their playing piece to the center space, and then place that piece in the correct snake's mouth. Spaces are either safety spots known as "Windows of Heaven" or spaces with Grim Reapers known as "Open Graves," which cause the player to draw a card. If the card is an Epitaph (a card with the words Vae Victis written below), the player who drew it is dead. If the card is not an Epitaph card, that player is safe.

Even if all but one player is dead, that player must continue playing until they reach the center. They do not need to reach the center space by exact count. Once there, they must ask the tower one question and place the playing piece in either the mouth of the black snake Spatium (Space) or of the white snake Tempus (Time). If they choose correctly, their wish comes true. If they choose incorrectly, they suffer the same fate as the witch: being skinned alive. Even if they choose correctly, the wish does not come true until all the players are dead from the effects of the Epitaph cards drawn during the game and the game is passed onto someone else.

References

External links

 

2009 films
2009 horror films
American horror films
English-language Spanish films
Fictional games
Films set in Spain
Films shot in Madrid
Madrid in fiction
Spanish horror films
2000s English-language films
2000s American films